Alinda was an ancient inland city of Caria in Anatolia.

Alinda may also refer to:

 887 Alinda, an asteroid
 Alinda (gastropod), a genus of land snails
 Alinda family, a group of asteroids

See also

 Linda (disambiguation)